Two athletes competed as part of the Athlete Refugee Team at the 2022 European Championships in Munich, Germany, from 11–21 August 2022.

Competitors

Sports
The following is the list of number of competitors in the Championships:

Origin and host NOCs

Athletics

References

Nations at the 2022 European Championships
Refugees